Graeme Landy (born 31 May 1954) is a former Australian rules football player who played in the VFL between 1975 and 1978 for the Geelong Football Club, from 1979 until 1986 for the Richmond Football Club and finally in 1987 and 1988 back at Geelong.

References
Hogan P: The Tigers Of Old, Richmond FC, Melbourne 1996

External links
 
 
 

Geelong Football Club players
Richmond Football Club players
Echuca Football Club players
Australian rules footballers from Victoria (Australia)
1954 births
Living people
Place of birth missing (living people)